Back on My Buck Shit is a mixtape by rapper Young Buck, Hosted by DJ Smallz and DJ Scream. The mixtape features exclusive tracks and freestyles from Young Buck with appearances by All Star Cashville Prince, Lil' Wayne, Yo Gotti, and Plies. It was released for digital download on May 26, 2009. The mixtape is Vol. 1 of a so far of a three volume release. However instead of DJ Smallz and DJ Scream, Vol. 2 & 3 are hosted by Drumma Boy. On mixtape website DatPiff, it has been certified Bronze for being downloaded over 25,000 times.

Background
Due to contract issues with G-Unit Records and a feud with label head 50 Cent, Young Buck couldn't release a new album. So with help from DJ Smallz and DJ Scream, Buck got together and they released an official mixtape strictly for his fans through Young Buck's record label Ca$hville Records.

Track list

References

External links 
 

2009 mixtape albums
Young Buck albums